Andreas was an Irish bishop in the thirteenth century: the first recorded Archdeacon of Dromore; and the third recorded Bishop of Dromore.

References

Archdeacons of Dromore
Bishops of Dromore
13th-century Roman Catholic bishops in Ireland